The Trace is a South Korean webtoon series written and illustrated by manhwa artist Go Yeong-hun (고영훈) or known as his pen name, "Nasty Cat". Envy, jealousy, and selfishness, such dark sides of humans can be seen in the work. The artist said that he wants to create the world of heroes with Korean identity.

It won the first prize and Netizen's Choice Award at the 1st SICAF International Digital Cartoon Competition held in 2006. Mr. Go was awarded with ten million won. The panel stated that they easily reached to choose it as the grand prix because not only it scored the highest point in the netizens' recommended works but also it fully meets the required criteria; characteristics of web manhwa technique, and artistic features.

Since April 2007 this manhwa had been featured on Daum, one of major internet portals of South Korea that is being considered a birthplace of many hit webtoons.

Plot
The story is set in contemporary South Korea. Some 30 years ago, unidentified creatures appeared out of nowhere and attacked mankind. They caused massive destruction wherever they went. The monsters are called "Troubles", and caused the world to fall into chaos. Along with the first appearance of the "Troubles", some number of humans were born with or acquired supernatural abilities. These mutants called "Traces" are the only ones who can fight off the Troubles. The Traces are also considered freaks and generally shunned by the community because some of them misused the powers for their own interest.

The plot revolves around two main characters. Sah Gang-kwon, a high school student born as a "Trace" who attempts to hide his ability. The other is Kim Yun-Seong, who acquired his "Trace" abilities during his early 30s. Soon after the acquisition, his wife and daughter were taken away from him for experimental purposes.

 Things you need to let go
This arc shares about Ghang Gwon and Tae Eun's story. Ghang Gwon was taken in by Tae Eun's family as a child and hides the fact that he is a 'trace'. He doesn't sleep at night but instead, goes out hunting 'troubles' to protect Tae Eun and her father, which he regards as his family. An unexpected turn of events revealed his identity in school and Ghang Gwon was reported as a trace, being forced to leave them temporarily. It made him realise that it was not possible for him to live as a mere human being with his ability.

 Beggar
This arc revolves around the middle aged man, Kim Yun Seong. All he wanted was a peaceful life with his family, away from Traces and Troubles. When he realized he acquired his "trace" abilities, he tried to hide it but was discovered by the government and his family was taken away. He joins up with a group of other Traces to help him get into the facility where he believes his family is held.

 Rose
This arc revolved to the story of Morrienoah Jin, a child which his ability is shot things with his fingers. He was being an assassin and worked with Morie. One day, a girl(Jang-mi) stood outside his house, made a dealt with Morrienoah Jin to protect her. When the deadline almost comes, Jin was fritter her away because scared about love. After realize he couldn't kept it, he became to love Jang-mi.

 Rebellion
The arc kicks off with the assembly of various trace factions formed over by both Kim Yun Seong and Pierrot featuring old and new faces onto the crew of traces called the beggar group after Seong went to see a mysterious Trace to augment his abilities. They soon begin to attack a slew of experimental laboratories stationed all around Korea nabbing their top scientists while battling the ongoing inhibition efforts of various other trace factions sent against them such as the mysterious government sponsored Trace group; Hanjo.   
 The Last Day Pt.1

 The Last Day Pt.2

 Outro & Afterwards

Main characters

 Sa Ghang Gwon
Sa Ghang Gwon is a Trace with the ability to manipulate ice. His powers had been with him since his birth, and because he could not control them, Ghang Gwon accidentally attacked his own parents. With no cure or solution to Traces, his parents abandoned him on a street next to an old beggar woman Trace who could conjure fire. He wandered around for an indeterminable amount of time, living his life as a scavenger and losing his emotions. He engaged in battle with his first Trouble, but after realizing he could not defeat it, he encased himself in ice until it disappeared. He passed out in a park, where he was found by Han Tae Eun. She took him home and asked her father if she could keep him. Afterward Tae Eun called Ghang Gwon her possession. Her family, consisting of only her and her father, adopted him, but Ghang Gwon, fearing that they would abandon him like his parents, hid from them his identity as a Trace. Over the years, he continued to battle Troubles, honing his skills. Whenever he is injured, though, he lets Tae Eun believe that he was bullied by his classmates.

When a Trouble attacks his class, Ghang Gwon attempts to come to the rescue, but Tae Eun stops him, knowing that if he fights the Trouble, his identity as a Trace will be revealed. She begs him not to get involved, but Ghang Gwon engages the Trouble and defeats it. Afterwards, he is taken by the government for three months, and then enrolled in a Trace school. His prime objective is to leave the Trace school and return to his family as soon as possible, and he believes that capturing the Beggar Team will grant him freedom.

Ghang Gwon is very quiet and almost antisocial. He hates that he is a Trace, shamefully hiding it from Han Tae Eun and her father; often, he mutters to himself that he is not a Trace. But he also specifically uses his powers to battle and destroy Troubles, so that his family can be safe. He is easily bullied and also submits to their beatings without complaint (for the sake of Han Tae Eun's safety), which only angers her. He has no facial expressions and seems to enjoy antagonizing her, calling her "battle addict" or "fighting chicken." He is extremely protective of her and her father, as his family. He seems to find Tae Eun especially precious. It is hinted that he likes her as more than a sister; while in the Trace academy, he repeatedly writes letters to her, ending each with the words "I miss you."

 Han Tae Eun
Hot-blooded and fiery, Han Tae Eun is well known in her school as a formidable fighter, more inclined to her fists than talking things through. She yells often, especially at Sa Ghang Gwon when he aggravates her. As a child her mother was killed by a rogue Trace in a park, and Tae Eun repeatedly visited the same spot her mother died, until she found a barely conscious Sa Ghang Gwon lying there. She took him home and adopted him as her possession. At some point in time, she discovered he was a Trace and labored to protect his identity, unbeknownst to him.

When Sa Ghang Gwon is taken away by the government, Han Tae Eun declares that she will become a Trace and be like him. She repeatedly battles Troubles at the expense of her own life, but then she awakens as a Trace. Her arms turn a sparkling red and shoot sparks, granting her inhuman strength and abilities. It seems that she needs to repeatedly punch hard objects like the ground to activate one of her arms, but if she strikes her fists together, the other arm will ignite.

Tae Eun is easily angered and irritable but also fiercely protective of Sa Ghang Gwon. She protects him specifically to prevent him from fighting back, so that he won't accidentally reveal his identity as a Trace. She seemed to resent that he was a Trace while she wasn't and accused Ghang Gwon of the same feelings, since he tried to hide his true identity from her. She's stubborn, believing that if she fought Troubles, she would become a Trace. After she becomes one, she goes about fighting Troubles, in the same way Ghang Gwon did (dressed with a face mask). Tae Eun seems to hold romantic feelings for Ghang Gwon, getting jealous when he carries Se Yeon and tells Tae Eun to run while escaping a Trouble.

 Kim Yoon Seong
Kim Yoon Seong was a man with a perfect life: a job, a loving wife, and a daughter. All this changes when one day he turns into a trace. Being a law-abiding citizen, he decides to legally register as a trace, rather than hide his identity. After that he is separated from his family who are taken to a trace facility where the family of the traces are taken. When he is not able to contact them he goes to the facility to see his family where he is stopped by a group of trace guards and chased where he meets Jeong Hee Sub who is also a trace trying to get into the facility. They join and form a team and recruit other members. They succeed in entering the facility where Kim Yun Seong finds the family of the traces who are brought there are used for experimental purposes and killed.

 Morrienoah Jin
As a child, Jin was an emotionless trace who had ideals that 'The good should live, the bad should die', killing people who he deemed as bad. After coincidentally saving Morrie, he was raised by him to become a killer. He easily obtained the top title of Morrienoah that every killer wanted, being described as the perfect killer as he had no emotional weaknesses. This changed when he received a bizarre contract to protect a girl named Jang Mi (Rose) for a month from a killer. Rose gradually changed his life and Jin fell in love with her as the deadline drew closer. Jin managed to kill the killer after her life, yet, she committed suicide in front of him shortly after. Turns out that Rose was one of his victim's child and swore revenge by giving him love and make him lose it. Despite all that, she truly did love Jin. Jin was recruited into the 'Pierrot team' to infiltrate the facility much later in life.

See also
Pink Lady

Publications
Go Yeong-hun, The Trace 1 by Pop Toon on 15 April 2008 
Go Yeong-hun, The Trace 2 by Pop Toon on 15 May 2008 
Go Yeong-hun, The Trace 3 by Pop Toon on 15 December 2008 
Go Yeong-hun, The Trace 4 by Pop Toon on 10 July 2009

References

External links
 The Trace on Daum
 The manhwa artist's webpage

Fantasy comics
Science fiction comics
Manhwa titles
2007 comics debuts
South Korean webtoons
2010 comics endings
Fantasy webtoons
Science fiction webtoons